Ian Dennis (born 19 December 1987) is a British artist, most famous for posting videos of him making art on YouTube under the online alias Fox Bronte.

Early life
Ian Dennis was born in Bradford, West Yorkshire.

YouTube
While living at a youth hostel, Dennis began making art videos using a variety of materials - including coffee, toothpaste, junk mail, jams, and soil.

Dennis then began making videos as "Fox Bronte," a character based on the stereotypical "mad artist." Using humour and a surreal editing style, his channel quickly grew in both popularity and controversy, with Fox Bronte regularly taking his clothes off to create. Other videos included him using his penis, his vomit, and condoms. In January 2010, he drank different coloured juices to change the colour of his urine - to create a portrait of British National Party leader Nick Griffin.

Ian Dennis's latest channel "monalisanaked" follows on from his previous work. His videos attract a cult audience to the website.

Other works
In 2012, Dennis set up a prank appearance on Britain's Got Talent. As Fox Bronte he painted the hosts, Anthony McPartlin and Declan Donnelly on his buttocks.

References

External links
 
 
 

1987 births
British Internet celebrities
British video bloggers
Living people
Artists from Bradford
English video bloggers